Dendrites (from Greek δένδρον déndron, "tree"), also dendrons, are branched protoplasmic extensions of a nerve cell that propagate the electrochemical stimulation received from other neural cells to the cell body, or soma, of the neuron from which the dendrites project. Electrical stimulation is transmitted onto dendrites by upstream neurons (usually via their axons) via synapses which are located at various points throughout the dendritic tree.

Dendrites play a critical role in integrating these synaptic inputs and in determining the extent to which action potentials are produced by the neuron.

Structure 

Dendrites are one of two types of protoplasmic protrusions that extrude from the cell body of a neuron, the other type being an axon. Axons can be distinguished from dendrites by several features including shape, length, and function. Dendrites often taper off in shape and are shorter, while axons tend to maintain a constant radius and be relatively long. Typically, axons transmit electrochemical signals and dendrites receive the electrochemical signals, although some types of neurons in certain species lack axons and simply transmit signals via their dendrites. Dendrites provide an enlarged surface area to receive signals from the terminal buttons of other axons, and the axon also commonly divides at its far end into many branches (telodendria) each of which ends in a nerve terminal, allowing a chemical signal to pass simultaneously to many target cells.

Typically, when an electrochemical signal stimulates a neuron, it occurs at a dendrite and causes changes in the electrical potential across the neuron's plasma membrane. This change in the membrane potential will passively spread across the dendrite but becomes weaker with distance without an action potential. An action potential propagates the electrical activity along the membrane of the neuron's dendrites to the cell body and then afferently down the length of the axon to the axon terminal, where it triggers the release of neurotransmitters into the synaptic cleft. However, synapses involving dendrites can also be axodendritic, involving an axon signaling to a dendrite, or dendrodendritic, involving signaling between dendrites. An autapse is a synapse in which the axon of one neuron transmits signals to its own dendrites.

There are three main types of neurons; multipolar, bipolar, and unipolar. Multipolar neurons, such as the one shown in the image, are composed of one axon and many dendritic trees. Pyramidal cells are multipolar cortical neurons with pyramid shaped cell bodies and large dendrites called apical dendrites that extend to the surface of the cortex. Bipolar neurons have one axon and one dendritic tree at opposing ends of the cell body. Unipolar neurons have a stalk that extends from the cell body that separates into two branches with one containing the dendrites and the other with the terminal buttons. Unipolar dendrites are used to detect sensory stimuli such as touch or temperature.

Certain classes of dendrites contain small projections referred to as dendritic spines that increase receptive properties of dendrites to isolate signal specificity. Increased neural activity and the establishment of long-term potentiation at dendritic spines change the sizes, shape, and conduction. This ability for dendritic growth is thought to play a role in learning and memory formation. There can be as many as 15,000 spines per cell, each of which serves as a postsynaptic process for individual presynaptic axons. Dendritic branching can be extensive and in some cases is sufficient to receive as many as 100,000 inputs to a single neuron.

History
The term dendrites was first used in 1889 by Wilhelm His to describe the number of smaller "protoplasmic processes" that were attached to a nerve cell. German anatomist Otto Friedrich Karl Deiters is generally credited with the discovery of the axon by distinguishing it from the dendrites.

Some of the first intracellular recordings in a nervous system were made in the late 1930s by Kenneth S. Cole and Howard J. Curtis. Swiss Rüdolf Albert von Kölliker and German Robert Remak were the first to identify and characterize the axonal initial segment. Alan Hodgkin and Andrew Huxley also employed the squid giant axon (1939) and by 1952 they had obtained a full quantitative description of the ionic basis of the action potential, leading the formulation of the Hodgkin–Huxley model. Hodgkin and Huxley were awarded jointly the Nobel Prize for this work in 1963. The formulas detailing axonal conductance were extended to vertebrates in the Frankenhaeuser–Huxley equations. Louis-Antoine Ranvier was the first to describe the gaps or nodes found on axons and for this contribution these axonal features are now commonly referred to as the Nodes of Ranvier. Santiago Ramón y Cajal, a Spanish anatomist, proposed that axons were the output components of neurons. He also proposed that neurons were discrete cells that communicated with each other via specialized junctions, or spaces, between cells, now known as a synapse. Ramón y Cajal improved a silver staining process known as Golgi's method, which had been developed by his rival, Camillo Golgi.

Dendrite development

During the development of dendrites, several factors can influence differentiation. These include modulation of sensory input, environmental pollutants, body temperature, and drug use. For example, rats raised in dark environments were found to have a reduced number of spines in pyramidal cells located in the primary visual cortex and a marked change in distribution of dendrite branching in layer 4 stellate cells. Experiments done in vitro and in vivo have shown that the presence of afferents and input activity per se can modulate the patterns in which dendrites differentiate.

Little is known about the process by which dendrites orient themselves in vivo and are compelled to create the intricate branching pattern unique to each specific neuronal class. One theory on the mechanism of dendritic arbor development is the Synaptotropic Hypothesis. The synaptotropic hypothesis proposes that input from a presynaptic to a postsynaptic cell (and maturation of excitatory synaptic inputs) eventually can change the course of synapse formation at dendritic and axonal arbors.

This synapse formation is required for the development of neuronal structure in the functioning brain. A balance between metabolic costs of dendritic elaboration and the need to cover receptive field presumably determine the size and shape of dendrites. A complex array of extracellular and intracellular cues modulates dendrite development including transcription factors, receptor-ligand interactions, various signaling pathways, local translational machinery, cytoskeletal elements, Golgi outposts and endosomes. These contribute to the organization of the dendrites on individual cell bodies and the placement of these dendrites in the neuronal circuitry. For example, it was shown that β-actin zipcode binding protein 1 (ZBP1) contributes to proper dendritic branching.

Other important transcription factors involved in the morphology of dendrites include CUT, Abrupt, Collier, Spineless, ACJ6/drifter, CREST, NEUROD1, CREB, NEUROG2 etc. Secreted proteins and cell surface receptors includes neurotrophins and tyrosine kinase receptors, BMP7, Wnt/dishevelled, EPHB 1–3, Semaphorin/plexin-neuropilin, slit-robo, netrin-frazzled, reelin. Rac, CDC42 and RhoA serve as cytoskeletal regulators and the motor protein includes KIF5, dynein, LIS1. Important secretory and endocytic pathways controlling the dendritic development include DAR3 /SAR1, DAR2/Sec23, DAR6/Rab1 etc. All these molecules interplay with each other in controlling dendritic morphogenesis including the acquisition of type specific dendritic arborization, the regulation of dendrite size and the organization of dendrites emanating from different neurons.

Types of dendritic patterns 
Dendritic arborization, also known as dendritic branching, is a multi-step biological process by which neurons form new dendritic trees and branches to create new synapses. Dendrites in many organisms assume different morphological patterns of branching. The morphology of dendrites such as branch density and grouping patterns are highly correlated to the function of the neuron. Malformation of dendrites is also tightly correlated to impaired nervous system function. 

Branching morphologies may assume an adendritic structure (not having a branching structure, or not tree-like), or a tree-like radiation structure. Tree-like arborization patterns can be spindled (where two dendrites radiate from opposite poles of a cell body with few branches, see bipolar neurons ), spherical  (where dendrites radiate in a part or in all directions from a cell body, see cerebellar granule cells), laminar (where dendrites can either radiate planarly, offset from cell body by one or more stems, or multi-planarly, see retinal horizontal cells, retinal ganglion cells, retinal amacrine cells respectively), cylindrical (where dendrites radiate in all directions in a cylinder, disk-like fashion, see pallidal neurons), conical (dendrites radiate like a cone away from cell body, see pyramidal cells), or fanned (where dendrites radiate like a flat fan, see purkinje cells).

Electrical properties
The structure and branching of a neuron's dendrites, as well as the availability and variation of voltage-gated ion conductance, strongly influences how the neuron integrates the input from other neurons. This integration is both temporal, involving the summation of stimuli that arrive in rapid succession, as well as spatial, entailing the aggregation of excitatory and inhibitory inputs from separate branches.

Dendrites were once thought to merely convey electrical stimulation passively. This passive transmission means that voltage changes measured at the cell body are the result of activation of distal synapses propagating the electric signal towards the cell body without the aid of voltage-gated ion channels. Passive cable theory describes how voltage changes at a particular location on a dendrite transmit this electrical signal through a system of converging dendrite segments of different diameters, lengths, and electrical properties. Based on passive cable theory one can track how changes in a neuron's dendritic morphology impacts the membrane voltage at the cell body, and thus how variation in dendrite architectures affects the overall output characteristics of the neuron.

Electrochemical signals are propagated by action potentials that utilize intermembrane voltage-gated ion channels to transport sodium ions, calcium ions, and potassium ions. Each ion species has its own corresponding protein channel located in the lipid bilayer of the cell membrane. The cell membrane of neurons covers the axons, cell body, dendrites, etc. The protein channels can differ between chemical species in the amount of required activation voltage and the activation duration.

Action potentials in animal cells are generated by either sodium-gated or calcium-gated ion channels in the plasma membrane. These channels are closed when the membrane potential is near to, or at, the resting potential of the cell. The channels will start to open if the membrane potential increases, allowing sodium or calcium ions to flow into the cell. As more ions enter the cell, the membrane potential continues to rise. The process continues until all of the ion channels are open, causing a rapid increase in the membrane potential that then triggers the decrease in the membrane potential. The depolarizing is caused by the closing of the ion channels that prevent sodium ions from entering the neuron, and they are then actively transported out of the cell. Potassium channels are then activated, and there is an outward flow of potassium ions, returning the electrochemical gradient to the resting potential. After an action potential has occurred, there is a transient negative shift, called the afterhyperpolarization or refractory period, due to additional potassium currents. This is the mechanism that prevents an action potential from traveling back the way it just came.

Another important feature of dendrites, endowed by their active voltage gated conductance, is their ability to send action potentials back into the dendritic arbor. Known as back-propagating action potentials, these signals depolarize the dendritic arbor and provide a crucial component toward synapse modulation and long-term potentiation. Furthermore, a train of back-propagating action potentials artificially generated at the soma can induce a calcium action potential (a dendritic spike) at the dendritic initiation zone in certain types of neurons.

Plasticity
Dendrites themselves appear to be capable of plastic changes during the adult life of animals, including invertebrates. Neuronal dendrites have various compartments known as functional units that are able to compute incoming stimuli. These functional units are involved in processing input and are composed of the subdomains of dendrites such as spines, branches, or groupings of branches. Therefore, plasticity that leads to changes in the dendrite structure will affect communication and processing in the cell. During development, dendrite morphology is shaped by intrinsic programs within the cell's genome and extrinsic factors such as signals from other cells. But in adult life, extrinsic signals become more influential and cause more significant changes in dendrite structure compared to intrinsic signals during development. In females, the dendritic structure can change as a result of physiological conditions induced by hormones during periods such as pregnancy, lactation, and following the estrous cycle. This is particularly visible in pyramidal cells of the CA1 region of the hippocampus, where the density of dendrites can vary up to 30%. 

Recent experimental observations suggest that adaptation is performed in the neuronal dendritic trees, where the timescale of adaptation was observed to be as low as several seconds only. Certain machine learning architectures based on dendritic trees have shown to simplify the learning algorithm without affecting performance.

Notes

References

External links 

  - "Slide 3 Spinal cord"
 Dendritic Tree - Cell Centered Database
Stereo images of dendritic trees in Kryptopterus electroreceptor organs

Neurohistology
Neuroplasticity